Super Epsa is the former name of a supermarket chain in Lima, Peru, which was founded in 1953 by ALDO E OLCESE as Super Market S.A. The importance of this Supermarket chain lies in that it was the first occurrence of an American-style supermarket in Perú. Aldo Olcese was born in Lima on December 29, 1922. His father was a hard working Italian-Genoese immigrant. Aldo went to the United States in 1946 to study Business Administration at the University of Texas at Austin and he graduated in 1950. During his lifetime, as a student in the United States, he was impressed with one Super Market close to his residence where he frequently shopped together with his wife, and since then he thought it would be a great idea to carry out the same kind of self-service Super Market in Perú. In 1953, and for the first time in the Peruvian History, the first supermarket was officially opened in Av Larco 670, Miraflores, with great success. After 20 years in the Super Market business, the company opened a total of 14 supermarkets scattered throughout the Peruvian capital. 

Supermarkets of Peru